The Comilla University is a public university located at Kotbari, Comilla, Bangladesh. The university was constructed on 244.19 acres of land at Shalban Vihara, Moynamoti. Comilla University is affiliated by University Grants Commission, Bangladesh.

Golam Mowlah is the founder vice-chancellor of Comilla University who served until he was removed on 30 July 2008. Zulfikar Ali, a professor of mathematics, was given the charge as acting vice-chancellor. The next vice-chancellor of Comilla University, A.K.M. Zehadul Karim declared his resignation on 7 October 2009. Amir Hossen Khan, a professor of Physics department of Jahangirnagar University, was appointed as Vice-Chancellor on 22 November 2009. After expiration of the duration of Amir Hossen Khan then Dr. Ali Ashraf, a professor of Economics department and Ex-President of Chittagong University Teachers Association has been appointed as the 5th Vice-Chancellor of Comilla University. He joined the university on 3 December 201. Professor Dr. Emran Kabir Chowdhury on January 31, 2018 joined as the 6th Vice Chancellor of Comilla University.

It started with 7 functional departments. Now there are a total of 19 departments Under 6 faculties including Information & Communication Technology, Computer Science & Engineering, Pharmacy, Physics, Chemistry, Statistics, Mathematics, Finance and Banking, Accounting & Information Systems, Marketing, Management Studies, Mass Communication & Journalism, Law, Economics, Public Administration, Archeology, Anthropology, Bengali, and English.

Administration

 Chancellor: Mr. Md. Abdul Hamid (Hon’ble President of the People's Republic of Bangladesh) 
 Vice-Chancellor: Professor Dr. A. F. M. Abdul Moyeen
 Pro-Vice Chancellor: Professor Dr. Mohammad Humayun Kabir
 Treasurer: Professor Dr. Md. Asaduzzaman 
 Registrar: Professor Dr. Md Abu Taher

Vice Chancellors of the University Since 2006 

 Golam Mowlah (26 July 2006 – 30 July 2008) 
 M. Zulfikar Ali (31 July 2008 – 19 Oct 2008) 
 A. H. M. Zehadul Karim (20 Oct 2008 – 22 Nov 2009)
 Md. Amir Hossen Khan (23 Nov 2009 – 22 Nov 2013)
 Md. All Ashraf ( 3 Dec 2013 – 2 Dec 2017)
 Emran Kabir Chowdhury (31 Jan 2018 – 30 Jan 2022)
 A. F. M. Abdul Moyeen (31 Jan 2022 – Present)

At a glance

History
The executive committee of the National Economic Council (ECNEC) approved a project for the establishment of twelve science and technology universities in the country during 2001 and one of these was planned to be established in Comilla. But instead, the government granted a general university and its charter in Comilla on 8 May 2006, as the 26th public university under which the university is being operated.

The university formally started its journey on 28 May 2007, through an orientation program for the 2006–07 academic year with 300 students and 15 teachers enrolled in 7 departments under 4 faculties:

 Department of Mathematics under the Faculty of Science,
 Department of English under the Faculty of Arts & Humanities,
 Department of Economics and Public Administration under the Faculty of Social Science,
 Three departments (Accounting & Information Systems, Management, Marketing) under the School of Business.

The Department of Computer Science & Engineering (CSE) was introduced in the 2008–09 session. The Department of Bangla, Department of Anthropology and the Department of Information and Communication Technology (ICT) was introduced in the 2009–2010 session. Three new departments (Physics, Chemistry and Statistics) have been opened in the academic session 2010–2011. From the academic session 2013–14 three more department (Finance and Banking, Pharmacy and Archeology) have been introduced. Comilla University has more than four thousand students in different batches, 120 teachers and 100 staffs devoted to conducting teaching and research.

Academics

Faculties and departments
The university's 19 departments are organised into 6 faculties.

Academic buildings
There are four academic buildings (One is under process) in Comilla University Campus:
 Academic Building 1 (North) (Faculty of Business Studies)
 Academic Building 2 (South) (Faculty of Social Science, Arts)
 Academic Building 3 (Faculty of Science)
 Academic Building 4 (Faculty of Law and Engineering)

Residential student halls
There are five residential halls. Two for female and three for male students (one female hall is under process).
 Shaheed Dhirendranath Datta Hall
 Kazi Nazrul Islam Hall
 Bangabandhu Sheikh Mujibor Rahman Hall
 Nawab Faizunnesa Choudhurani Hall (Female)
 Sheikh Hasina Hall (Female)

See also
List of Educational Institutions in Comilla

References

External links
 Official Website

Public universities of Bangladesh
2006 establishments in Bangladesh
Educational institutions established in 2006
Universities and colleges in Cumilla District